Batman '89 is a superhero comic book limited series published by DC Comics that serves as an alternative continuation of Tim Burton's first two Batman films, Batman (1989) and Batman Returns (1992), which starred Michael Keaton as Bruce Wayne / Batman, while ignoring the events of Batman Forever (1995) and Batman & Robin (1997). The series is written by the first two films' screenwriter, Sam Hamm, and illustrated by Joe Quinones. It was launched in August 2021 and ran for six issues.

Plot summary 
Following the events of Batman Returns, Gotham City is in chaos as a result of a war between a gang of Joker-inspired criminals and a group of vigilantes dressed up as Batman. District attorney Harvey Dent vows to take down the real Batman, whom he holds responsible for inspiring these copycats, and to discredit police commissioner Jim Gordon. Dent is aided by his fiancée, Barbara Gordon, a GCPD sergeant and Gordon's daughter. One night, he brings the National Guard and tries to lure Batman into a trap using the Bat-Signal with Lieutenant Harvey Bullock. While patrolling in Dent's childhood neighborhood, Burnside, Batman encounters another masked vigilante as he confronts a young thief who was trying to help his younger sister. The thief is killed by a stray bullet when Batman attempts to escape the National Guard, leaving Bruce racked with guilt.

The vigilante is a young man from Burnside named Drake Winston, who works as a mechanic at an auto shop owned by Dent's childhood mentor, Jerome Otis. After being criticized by the Burnside neighborhood council for the National Guard's actions, Dent makes a powerful televised speech denouncing the violence. Inspired by the speech and the thief's death, Bruce meets with the council and Dent at Otis' auto shop and offers to pay for an education at Gotham University for all of the children in Burnside. Shortly after the meeting, the shop is attacked by the Batman impersonators, who tracked Drake to the garage after he stopped them from robbing a store during the speech. When Bruce attempts to stop them, he finds that they have already been defeated by Catwoman. Dent goes inside the burning auto shop to find Drake, where he is knocked unconscious near car batteries leaking sulfuric acid.

Bruce and Drake work together to rescue Harvey just before the auto shop blows up. Dent survives but is rushed to the hospital after the acid burns the left side of his face. Much to his dismay, Bruce is hailed as a hero by the press and finds out that Drake saw him confront the arsonists. At the hospital, Dent's subconscious (taking on the form of an alternate self where he rescued Drake and became governor) encourages him to think of the power in the choices he makes, inspiring him to mark one side of his two-headed coin. Later that night, Catwoman tells Batman she's back in Gotham to track down rich criminals and criticizes him for not making more of an effort to stop them before they go on to stop the fires from the arsonists, who were released early on bail.

Dent escapes his hospital room as he begins displaying increasingly erratic behavior and relying on his coin to make most of his decisions. Barbara hears what Dent did the next day while talking to Selina Kyle, who takes the opportunity to scan Barbara's hard drive under the guise of helping her with a virus. Dent steals multiple files from the GCPD before retreating into the subway and sets up the abandoned Burnside station as his new base of operations. Meanwhile, Bruce invites Drake to meet him at Wayne Manor to discuss the arsonists. Prior to their meeting, Bruce learns that his great-grandfather acquired an automotive company owned by Drake's ancestors in a forced buyout. Drake goads Bruce into fighting him and deduces that he is Batman from his fighting style before revealing himself to be the masked vigilante from Burnside. He proposes they form a partnership to combat the chaos slowly brewing in the city.

As her father resigns as commissioner, Barbara receives a note from Dent telling her to meet him at the park. Dent hires a criminal the police use as an informant who was connected to "The Lincoln Job", a case where a group of robbers attempted to rob 31 million dollars in two armored cars, and uses him to recruit the various Joker gangs for an attack on the GCPD. They collapse four subway tunnels in close proximity to the GCPD headquarters and ambush the police outside. Batman helps Gordon fight the gang members inside while Drake takes out the snipers covering the streets. They eventually confront Dent in the evidence room stealing a suitcase from the Lincoln Job case after shooting Bullock. Dent manages to make Batman accidentally shoot Gordon with a knockout dart, allowing him to steal the suitcase and kidnap the commissioner while forcing Batman to stay behind to save Bullock and deal with the police.

The next day, Dent donates $900,000 to the residents of Burnside. Batman and Drake locate him at the park where he's meeting with Barbara thanks to Gordon placing the knockout dart in his clothes. Barbara attempts to arrest Dent, but is knocked out by Catwoman, who encourages Batman and Drake to follow Dent while she takes care of the police and henchmen nearby. At the station, Gordon calls out Dent for his twisted sense of morality, prompting him to shoot the commissioner despite the coin flip encouraging him not to. As Gordon dies, Batman arrives to confront the fallen district attorney. Dent blows up the station and critically injures Batman, discovering his secret identity in the process. Catwoman and Drake arrive to rescue Bruce and take him back to the Batcave for Alfred to tend to his wounds.

When Bruce wakes up, Selina tells him about the Lincoln Job case that she's been investigating. A financial company called Lincoln Savings and Loan had been running federal aid funds through a string of mobbed-up front companies which resulted in millions in kickbacks for politicians and less for the city. The suitcase Dent stole contains incriminating documents against them, giving him control over all the major politicians in the city. Dent orders them to drop all charges against him and displays his dominance by killing mob boss Carmine Falcone. The next day, Dent murders Otis after the latter disowns him and frames Drake for the crime. He then drives to Wayne Manor and meets Bruce in the Batcave, attempting to use his secret to blackmail Batman into becoming his enforcer. Bruce refuses and instead allows Dent to flip his coin to give him two options: kill Bruce, or allow Bruce to help him reform so they could work together to save the city the right way. As Dent flips the coin, Catwoman cuts the giant penny hanging in the Batcave and makes it land right next to him, causing Dent to fall to his death.

Bruce chastises Selina and claims he palmed Dent's coin so that it would've landed on the good side, and gives up on reforming her. Selina calls Bruce out for his rich upbringing and finds out he actually gave Dent his own coin back. As she takes her cat and decides to leave him for good, Bruce finds out she placed a microphone in the cat's collar. Two days later, Bruce clears Drake's name from Otis' death and gives him access to the Batcycle. Drake tells Bruce he has an older sister who'd be willing to adopt the thief's younger sister and suggests sending her there instead of just setting her up with a $10 million trust fund so that she could grow up with a loving family. Barbara receives a package from the late Harvey that contains evidence revealing Batman's secret identity and a letter from Catwoman offering her partnership to incriminate Gotham's power elite. Later that night, Bruce decides on whether to go out on patrol or not by flipping a coin as the Bat-Signal shines in the sky.

Development 
After the success of the Batman '66 comic book series, comic book artist Joe Quinones revealed in March 2016 that he and Kate Leth had pitched a Batman comic book series set in the world of Tim Burton's Batman universe to DC Comics in 2015. He also revealed the concept art they had submitted. The book would have picked up after the events of 1992's Batman Returns. Quinones said about the inclusion of the characters in the comic: "We would have seen the return of Selina Kyle/Catwoman as well as introductions to 'Burton-verse' versions of Robin (designed to be portrayed by Marlon Wayans), Barbara Gordon (designed to be portrayed by Winona Ryder), Harley Quinn and Poison Ivy (the latter designed to be portrayed by Geena Davis). It also would have showcased the turn of Billy Dee Williams' Harvey Dent into Two-Face". The pitch was initially rejected by DC. In 2019, DC's Chief Creative Officer and publisher at DC, Jim Lee, acknowledged that many artists and writers had proposed a comic book series set in the Burton-verse over the years and that the book being made in the future wasn't out of the realm of possibility.

In February 2021, DC announced to release a comic book continuation of Batman Returns entitled Batman '89, ignoring the subsequent films Batman Forever (1995) and Batman & Robin (1997), in which actor Michael Keaton did not appear following Burton's departure from the franchise. DC further revealed that the series would be written by Sam Hamm and illustrated by Quinones, and would include the return of Catwoman (Michelle Pfeiffer) while also introducing a new version of Robin named Drake Winston (whose appearance is inspired by Marlon Wayans, who was originally attached to play the role in the Burton films) and showing the transformation of Billy Dee Williams' Harvey Dent into Two-Face.

In response to a question as to whether the Joel Schumacher Batman films are canon to the world of Batman '89, Hamm responded that the Schumacher films take place on the alternate universe of "Earth-97" as opposed to Batman '89s "Earth-89". On Twitter, Joe Quinones revealed that the story "loosely takes place in the mid-nineties". During the events of Dark Crisis: Big Bang #1 (December 2022) by Mark Waid and Dan Jurgens, DC Comics officially acknowledged the events of Batman '89 as taking place on Earth-789, merging the events of Tim Burton's Batman films and the comic, with the events of the films Superman (1978) and Superman II (1980) directed by Richard Donner, and their comic continuation Superman '78, which similarly disregarded the respective events of Superman III (1983), Supergirl (1984) directed by Jeannot Szwarc, Superman IV: The Quest for Peace (1987) and Superman Returns (2006).

Publications
 Batman '89 #1 (2021-08-10)
 Batman '89 #2 (2021-09-14)
 Batman '89 #3 (2021-10-12)
 Batman '89 #4 (2021-12-07)
 Batman '89 #5 (2022-04-12)
 Batman '89 #6 (2022-07-05)

Collected editions
 Hardcover, DC Comics, 2022.

Critical reception
Batman '89 received critical acclaim, scoring an average rating of 8.3 for the entire series based on 71 critic reviews aggregated by ComicBookRoundup.com. Syfy Wires Matthew Jackson wrote: "This is more than a tribute. It's a bold reimagining and a killer exercise in worldbuilding on Hamm's part, bolstered by Quinones' pitch perfect art". Toussaint Egan of Polygon praised the book's "multifaceted depiction of people of color". John Saavedra of Den of Geek stated: "[I]ssue one is a promising start for a modern reinvention of the Burtonverse". Bleeding Cool dubbed the book "pitch perfect", rating it 8.5 out of 10; it also topped the site's Bestseller List. Screen Rant stated that Batman '89 proves that casting actor Tommy Lee Jones as Two-Face (in 1995's Batman Forever) was "a mistake".

See also
 Superman '78

References

External links
DC Comics page

2021 comics debuts
Batman titles
Comics based on films
DC Comics titles
Batman (1989 film series)
Sequel comics